Yes Acoustic: Guaranteed No Hiss is the video release of an acoustic concert by the progressive rock group Yes recorded live on January 26, 2004, and broadcast live to movie theatres around the United States following the première of the documentary Yesspeak. After the film was played in theatres, cameras cut live to a small studio in California with an audience of about 100 people, where Yes performed the first complete acoustic concert of their career.

Personnel
Jon Anderson: vocals, guitar, percussion
Steve Howe: guitar, vocals
Rick Wakeman: piano
Chris Squire: bass, vocals
Alan White: drums

Track listing

Yes (band) video albums
2004 video albums
Yes (band) live albums
Live video albums
2004 live albums